Bywater  is an uncommon English surname of Old English origin and can most frequently be found in the English region of Yorkshire. It is a topographical surname given to those who were situated near a body of water.

Etymology 
Bywater is an uncommon surname of Old English origin. It is a topographical surname given to those who were situated near a body of water. The name derives from the merger of the Old English words bi (Middle English: by) and waeter (Middle English: water) to form biwaeter.

Topographical surnames are among the earliest created, because natural and artificial features in the landscape provided easily identifiable and distinguishing names among small communities in medieval England.

History 
The surname was first recorded by Thomas Bithewater, a witness to a wedding which dates to 1219, in the Yorkshire Assize Rolls.

It was first recorded in Middle English at the marriage of John Bywater and Eleonar Copgood at St Martin-in-the-Fields on 19 September 1637.

Geographical dispersion 
For such a simple topographical surname, it has experienced very little geographical dispersal in its descendants, and the vast majority of people with the surname are to this day still located in the Yorkshire region. The name can also be found to an even lesser extent in London and other parts of the UK, as well as former British colonies in the United States, Canada, South Africa, Australia and New Zealand, who themselves are descendants from individuals who emigrated from Yorkshire.

People 
 Hector Charles Bywater, an English naval expert, author and WWI spy obscurely famous for accurately predicting WWII in the Pacific.
 Hetti Bywater, British actress
 Ingram Bywater, an English classical scholar
 Jim Bywater, British actor
 Michael Bywater, an English writer
 Richard Arthur Samuel Bywater, recipient of the George Cross
 Ron Bywater, an Australian rules footballer
 Stephen Bywater, an English footballer
 Terry Bywater, British Paralympic athlete in wheelchair basketball

References 

English-language surnames